John Neilson (born 26 December 1874) was a Scottish footballer who played for Abercorn, Celtic, Third Lanark, Bristol Rovers and Albion Rovers, mainly as a left half.

He won the Scottish Football League championship with Third Lanark in 1903–04 and played in two consecutive Scottish Cup finals – a win over Rangers in 1905 via a replay and a loss to Heart of Midlothian in 1906. He also won two Glasgow Cup medals, the second of which (from the 1903–04 season) was sold at auction in 2011.

John Neilson was selected once for the Scottish Football League XI in 1900, and scored in this match a 6-0 victory over the Irish League XI.

References

1874 births
Year of death missing
Place of death missing
Scottish footballers
Footballers from Renfrewshire
People from Renfrew
Third Lanark A.C. players
Bristol Rovers F.C. players
Celtic F.C. players
Abercorn F.C. players
Wishaw Thistle F.C. players
Albion Rovers F.C. players
Scottish Football League players
Scottish Football League representative players
Southern Football League players
Association football wing halves
Scottish Junior Football Association players
Renfrew Victoria F.C. players